Thirty-Nine is a 2022 South Korean television series directed by Kim Sang-ho and starring Son Ye-jin, Jeon Mi-do, and Kim Ji-hyun. The series revolves around the life, friendship, romances, and love of three friends who are about to turn forty. It premiered on JTBC on February 16, 2022 and aired every Wednesday and Thursday at 22:30 (KST) for 12 episodes. It is available for streaming on Netflix.

The last episode of the series logged its highest ratings national wide: of 8.1%. Additionally, it was listed for four weeks in the Global Top 10 weekly list of the most-watched international Netflix TV shows as of April 3.

Cast and characters

Main
 Son Ye-jin as Cha Mi-jo, 39 years old, physician and director of Gangnam Dermatology Clinic. 
 Shin So-hyun as young Cha Mi-jo. 
 Jeon Mi-do as Jeong Chan-young, 39 years old, a drama coach.
 Ha Seon-ho as young Jeong Chan-young.
 Kim Ji-hyun as Jang Joo-hee, 39 years old, a cosmetics saleswoman at a department store.
 Lee Da-yeon as young Jang Joo-hee.

Supporting
 Yeon Woo-jin as Kim Seon-woo, a 39-year-old dermatologist.
 Lee Moo-saeng as Kim Jin-seok, a 42-year-old talent agent. 
 Lee Tae-hwan as Park Hyun-joon, a 35-year-old chef and owner of a Chinatown restaurant.
 Ahn So-hee as Kim So-won, younger sister of Kim Seon-woo, and a pianist.

People around Cha Mi-jo 
 Lee Kan-hee as Mi-jo's mother.
 Kang Mal-geum as Cha Mi-hyun, 44 years old, Mi-jo's older sister, administrator of their clinic.
 Yoon Hye-bin as young Cha Mi-hyun.
 Park Ji-il as Professor Cha Yoo-hyeok, Mi-jo's father.

People around Jeong Chan-young 
 Seo Hyun-chul as Chan-young's father.
 Lee Ji-Hyun as Chan-young's mother.

People around Jang Joo-hee 
 Nam Gi-ae as Joo-hee's mother.

Others 
 Song Min-ji as Kang Seon-joo, 37 years old, Jinseok's wife. She is from a wealthy family and demands to have whatever she wants.
 Oh Se-young as Cho Hye-jin, 27 years old, a graduate student who is Hyun-jun's girlfriend. 
 Jo Won-hee as Kim Jeong-tak, Kim Seon-woo's father and Kim So-won's adoptive father.
 Seo Ji-young as Lee Kyung-sook, Cha Mi-jo's biological mother.

Special appearance 
 Kim Kwon as an Chan-young's acting student. (Ep. 1).
 Hwang Bo-reum-byeol as Chan-young's acting student. (Ep. 3).
 Han Soo-ah as Hye-jin's friend (Ep.4).
 Han Bo-reum as an acting student (Ep. 7).
 Im Si-wan as Im Siwan, lead actor in the film within the film, and a former student of Chan-young. 
 Kang Tae-oh as Park Hyun-joon's friend.

Production

Casting 
In April 2021, it was announced that Son Ye-jin and Jeon Mi-do were in talks to appear inThirty-Nine, a 12-episode mini-series co-produced by Lotte Cultureworks and JTBC Studio. Son confirmed her appearance in June 2021, while Jeon and Kim Ji-hyun confirmed in August. Thirty-Nine marks Son's return to JTBC after three years; she last appeared in JTBC's 2018 TV series Something in the Rain.

Filming 
Filming began in August 2021. On January 12, 2022, photos from the script reading were published.

Original soundtrack

Part 1

Part 2

Part 3

Part 4

Part 5

Part 6

Viewership

Awards and nominations

Note

References

External links
  
 
 
 
 Thirty-Nine at Daum 
  Thirty-Nine at Naver 

JTBC television dramas
2022 South Korean television series debuts
2022 South Korean television series endings
Television series by JTBC Studios
South Korean romance television series
Korean-language Netflix exclusive international distribution programming